Aslauga orientalis is a butterfly in the family Lycaenidae. It is found along the coasts of Kenya and Tanzania and in Zambia.

The larvae feed on Coccidae species.

References

Butterflies described in 1981
Aslauga